is a landmark decision of the Supreme Court of Canada, dealing with the Canadian doctrine of cooperative federalism and how it intersects with the power of the Parliament of Canada over trade and commerce, as well as discussing the nature of parliamentary sovereignty in Canada.

Background

Canadian securities regulation is unique in that Canada is the only industrialized country in the world without a national securities regulator, and thus the field is solely regulated by provincial and territorial governments. While those governments have worked to harmonize many of their policies, there is still enough variation that securities issuers must reconcile in order to have their securities trade among residents in each of the jurisdictions involved.

Since the 1930s, there has been debate about the desirability of establishing a single national securities regulator, but serious discussions only began in 1964. In 2010, a draft Canadian Securities Act was published, on which a reference question was posed to the Supreme Court of Canada on its constitutionality. In Reference re Securities Act, the Court ruled that the proposed Act overreached genuine national concerns, and thus intruded too far into the provincial power over property and civil rights.

Certain observers agreed that a national regulatory authority with a more focused brief was still possible under other heads of federal power, as was the option of instituting a cooperative framework with the provinces. There was debate as to the likelihood of the provinces' cooperation. In January 2012, Minister of Finance Jim Flaherty stated that work was still continuing with the provinces to create a national regulator that would function within the bounds that the Court declared was within federal jurisdiction. In September 2014, his successor Joe Oliver announced that agreement had been reached with several of the provinces to create a Cooperative Capital Markets Regulatory System, and a memorandum of understanding was signed to that effect.

The memorandum contemplated:

 the passage of a federal Capital Markets Stability Act, aimed at preventing and managing systemic risk, as well as establishing criminal offences relating to financial markets
 the passage by the participating provinces and territories of a "Model Provincial Act", dealing primarily with the day-to-day aspects of the securities trade
 a "Capital Markets Regulatory Authority", drawing its authority from the federal and provincial Acts, to act as a national securities regulator
 a Council of Ministers, which would supervise the Authority, recommend amendments to the Model Provincial Act, and make regulations by authority of both the federal and provincial Acts

Quebec reference
Although not a signatory to that memorandum, the Government of Quebec in July 2015 posed the following reference questions to the Quebec Court of Appeal:

Does the Constitution of Canada authorize the implementation of pan-Canadian securities regulation under the authority of a single regulator, according to the model established by the most recent publication of the Memorandum of Agreement regarding the Cooperative Capital Markets Regulatory System?
Does the most recent version of the draft of the federal Capital Markets Stability Act exceed the authority of the Parliament of Canada over the general branch of the trade and commerce power under subsection 91(2) of the Constitution Act, 1867?

In May 2017, the Court of Appeal responded in a 4-1 decision, answering:

No.
No, except with respect to its sections 7679 concerning the role and powers of the Council of Ministers which, if not removed, render the act unconstitutional as a whole.

For his part, Schrager JA declined to answer the first question, and answered No to the second.

Three appeals were lodged with the Supreme Court of Canada:

 the Attorney General of Canada with respect to both questions
 the Attorney General of British Columbia with respect to the first question
 the Attorney General of Quebec with respect to the second question

At the Supreme Court
In November 2018, the Court allowed the first two appeals and dismissed the third in handing down a unanimous decision, giving as its answers to the questions posed:

Yes.
No.

Cooperative federalism

Does it improperly fetter the legislatures' sovereignty?
The MOU expressly contemplated that the objective was "to establish a unified and cooperative system for the regulation of capital markets in Canada in a manner that accords with the constitutional division of powers":

The Court held that this was an important point to be made:

Therefore, the proposition that this framework fettered the participating provinces' law-making powers was rejected.

The Court also noted that the majority in the Court of Appeal misunderstood the nature of parliamentary sovereignty, pointing out that, since Hodge v The Queen, "the sovereignty of Parliament and of the provincial legislatures has been limited in Canada since Confederation." An important corollary, as noted in the Reference re Anti-Inflation Act, is that "the executive cannot unilaterally fetter the legislature's law-making power." That was also noted to be the case for treaties entered into by the Government of Canada, which cannot bind the provinces without them passing implementing legislation (as noted by the Judicial Committee of the Privy Council in the Labour Conventions Reference). Because of this jurisprudence:

Therefore, "the principle of parliamentary sovereignty is precisely what preserves the provincial legislatures' right to enact, amend and repeal their securities legislation independently of the Council of Ministers' approval," and "legislatures in Canada are constrained only by the Constitution  and are otherwise free to enact laws that they consider desirable and politically appropriate."

Delegation of law-making authority
While Parliament and the legislatures may delegate subordinate law-making powers to a person or administrative body, they have no power to transfer to another legislature the primary power to legislate As "[n]either the Memorandum nor the Model Provincial Act empowers the Council of Ministers to unilaterally amend the provinces' securities legislation," and "no part of the Cooperative System imposes any legal limit on the participating provinces' legislative authority to enact, amend and repeal their respective securities laws as they see fit," the proposed Council of Ministers will not possess primary legislative authority, and is thus considered constitutional.

Trade and commerce power

Pith and substance
Citing their previous concerns raised in Reference re Securities Act, and employing the criteria first employed in General Motors of Canada Ltd v City National Leasing to determine whether a federal law is a valid exercise of the "general" trade and commerce power, the Court observed:

The proposed framework therefore falls within the scope of the trade and commerce power.

Delegation to the Council of Ministers
In addition, the ability of the proposed Council of Ministers to make subordinate legislation is not an issue, and the Court endorsed Schrager JA's views in the matter:

Therefore, the Draft Federal Act would be constitutionally valid when passed.

Limits on the opinion
The Court warned that its ruling was not exhaustive on the subject:

Aftermath
One commentator noted that the Court "walked a tight line to ensure that the principles of federalism are upheld," and thus avoiding the consequences arising in the Securities Act Reference. As only five provinces and one territory have come on board to date for the new scheme, "[t]he willingness of other provinces and territories to join the regime will be indicative of its overall success."

Previous commentary on Reference re Securities Act had noted that the third GM indicia on "trade as a whole" was considered to be the decisive factor that rendered the proposed law unconstitutional, because any proposed law under the trade and commerce power "must be qualitatively different from provincial powers, and not merely different in the relative effectiveness of federal regulation." In that respect, the fourth and fifth GM indicia are now "relevant only to the extent that they identify a constitutional 'gap' that transcends the local." The incorporation of the Securities Act reasoning appears to confirm that this is now the current line of jurisprudence for assessing the federal power in this field.

See also
 Reference re Securities Act
 General Motors of Canada Ltd v City National Leasing

Further reading

Notes and references

Notes

References

External links
 
 

Canadian federalism case law
Supreme Court of Canada cases
2018 in Canadian case law
Supreme Court of Canada reference question cases